Helenów may refer to the following places:
Helenów, Gmina Bełchatów in Łódź Voivodeship (central Poland)
Helenów, Gmina Drużbice in Łódź Voivodeship (central Poland)
Helenów, Chełm County in Lublin Voivodeship (east Poland)
Helenów, Brzeziny County in Łódź Voivodeship (central Poland)
Helenów, Rawa County in Łódź Voivodeship (central Poland)
Helenów, Gmina Budziszewice in Łódź Voivodeship (central Poland)
Helenów, Gmina Czerniewice in Łódź Voivodeship (central Poland)
Helenów, Gmina Ujazd in Łódź Voivodeship (central Poland)
Helenów, Gmina Głowno in Łódź Voivodeship (central Poland)
Helenów, Gmina Ozorków in Łódź Voivodeship (central Poland)
Helenów, Gmina Adamów in Lublin Voivodeship (east Poland)
Helenów, Gmina Wojcieszków in Lublin Voivodeship (east Poland)
Helenów, Białobrzegi County in Masovian Voivodeship (east-central Poland)
Helenów, Gmina Gostynin in Masovian Voivodeship (east-central Poland)
Helenów, Gmina Szczawin Kościelny in Masovian Voivodeship (east-central Poland)
Helenów, Kozienice County in Masovian Voivodeship (east-central Poland)
Helenów, Lipsko County in Masovian Voivodeship (east-central Poland)
Helenów, Przasnysz County in Masovian Voivodeship (east-central Poland)
Helenów, Radom County in Masovian Voivodeship (east-central Poland)
Helenów, Gmina Wiśniew in Masovian Voivodeship (east-central Poland)
Helenów, Gmina Wodynie in Masovian Voivodeship (east-central Poland)
Helenów, Sochaczew County in Masovian Voivodeship (east-central Poland)
Helenów, Szydłowiec County in Masovian Voivodeship (east-central Poland)
Helenów, Węgrów County in Masovian Voivodeship (east-central Poland)
Helenów, Gmina Wołomin in Masovian Voivodeship (east-central Poland)
Helenów, Gmina Poświętne in Masovian Voivodeship (east-central Poland)
Helenów, Gmina Zwoleń in Masovian Voivodeship (east-central Poland)
Helenów, Gmina Policzna in Masovian Voivodeship (east-central Poland)
Helenów, Gmina Przyłęk in Masovian Voivodeship (east-central Poland)
Helenów, Gmina Szczytniki in Greater Poland Voivodeship (west-central Poland)
Helenów, Gmina Żelazków in Greater Poland Voivodeship (west-central Poland)